Malgassophlebia bispina is a species of dragonfly in the family Libellulidae. It is found in the Democratic Republic of the Congo, Guinea, Liberia, Nigeria, Uganda, and Zambia. Its natural habitat is subtropical or tropical moist lowland forests.

References

Libellulidae
Taxa named by Frederic Charles Fraser
Insects described in 1958
Taxonomy articles created by Polbot